Maries County Jail and Sheriff's House, also known as the Old Jail Museum, is a historic jail and sheriff's residence located in Vienna, Maries County, Missouri. It was built between 1856 and 1858, and is a two-story rectangular building, constructed of rough-cut native limestone ashlar blocks. It was moved to its present location in 1959, where it is now used as a museum.

It was added to the National Register of Historic Places in 2002.

References

History museums in Missouri
Government buildings on the National Register of Historic Places in Missouri
Government buildings completed in 1858
Buildings and structures in Maries County, Missouri
National Register of Historic Places in Maries County, Missouri